Ahmed Juma Ngwali (born 1 January 1973) is a Tanzanian CUF politician and Member of Parliament for Ziwani constituency since 2010.

References

Living people
1973 births
Civic United Front MPs
Tanzanian MPs 2010–2015
Fidel Castro Secondary School alumni
Zanzibari politicians